Arthur M'Gynd was a Roman Catholic priest in Ireland in the 16th-century: he was Archdeacon of Dromore  from 1518 until 1529; and Rector of Tullylish and prebendary of Lann in Dromore Cathedral from 1526.

Notes

Archdeacons of Dromore
16th-century Irish Roman Catholic priests